"I Am" is a song by American R&B singer Mary J. Blige. It was written by Blige, Johntá Austin, Ester Dean, Magnus Beite, Tor Erik Hermansen, Mikkel Eriksen for her ninth studio album, Stronger with Each Tear (2009), while production was helmed by Hermansen and Eriksen under their production moniker Stargate. Lyrically, the song "I Am" confidently tells one's lover nobody can treat them better than the person they are with at the present time.

Release and promotion
"I Am" was sent to urban radio in the week beginning November 10, 2009 and was released as a digital download on December 8, 2009 She performed "I Am" live for the first time at the 2009 American Music Awards on November 22, 2009. Blige also performed "I Am" on Lopez Tonight, So You Think You Can Dance, The Jay Leno Show, Jimmy Kimmel Live!, A&E Television's Private Sessions, The Today Show, The View, The Ellen DeGeneres Show, and on the Late Show with David Letterman. In the United Kingdom, the song was released as the first single from Stronger with Each Tear on March 1, 2010. Mary J Blige performed "I Am" on Alan Carr: Chatty Man on March 11, 2010.

Chart performance
"I Am" debuted at number 67 on the US Billboard Hot 100 in the week ending December 26, 2009. It eventually peaked at number 55, also reaching number three on the Dance Club Songs and number four on the Hot R&B/Hip-Hop Songs as well as topping the Adult R&B Songs. Billboard ranked it 12th on the latter chart's 2010 year-end ranking. In the United Kingdom, "I Am" entered and peaked on the UK Singles Chart at number 24 on March 7, 2010. Elsewhere, it peaked at number 11 on the Japan Hot 100.

Music video
The music video for "I Am" was directed by Anthony Mandler. The video premiered via Vevo on December 8, 2009.

Charts

Weekly charts

Year-end charts

Release history

References

2009 singles
Mary J. Blige songs
Song recordings produced by Stargate (record producers)
Songs written by Tor Erik Hermansen
Songs written by Mikkel Storleer Eriksen
Songs written by Mary J. Blige
Songs written by Ester Dean
Songs written by Johntá Austin
Music videos directed by Anthony Mandler
2009 songs
Geffen Records singles